The rufous-crowned bee-eater (Merops americanus) is a species of bird in the family Meropidae. It is endemic to the Philippines, where it is widely distributed. Despite its scientific name, it is not found in the New World, and its name is likely erroneous.

It was previously considered a subspecies of the blue-throated bee-eater (M. viridis), but was split as a distinct species by the IUCN Red List and BirdLife International in 2014, and the International Ornithological Congress followed suit in 2022.

References

rufous-crowned bee-eater
rufous-crowned bee-eater
rufous-crowned bee-eater